Adam McDaid is an Irish cricketer. He made his List A debut for North West Warriors in the 2019 Inter-Provincial Cup on 27 May 2019. He made his Twenty20 debut for North West Warriors in the 2019 Inter-Provincial Trophy on 22 June 2019.

References

External links
 

Year of birth missing (living people)
Living people
Irish cricketers
Place of birth missing (living people)
North West Warriors cricketers